Choi Eun-Sook (Hangul: 최은숙, Hanja: 崔恩淑; ; born February 28, 1986, in Gwangju) is a South Korean épée fencer.

Biography
Choi first drew attention at the 2005 World Junior Fencing Championships where she won the silver medal in the women's individual épée, losing to Sophie Lamon of Switzerland 15–12 in the final. Next year, Choi became runner-up again at the 2006 World Junior Fencing Championships, losing to Tiffany Géroudet of Switzerland 15–11 in the gold medal match.

In 2005 Choi earned her first call-up to the South Korean senior national team to compete at the 2005 World Fencing Championships. After the 2006 Asian Games where she won silver in the women's épée team event, however, Choi was not regularly selected for the national team until the 2011 season. 
    
She competed at the 2012 Summer Olympics in the Women's épée team event as a substitute.

References

External links
 Choi Eun-Sook at BBC Sport

1986 births
Living people
South Korean female fencers
Olympic fencers of South Korea
Fencers at the 2012 Summer Olympics
Fencers at the 2016 Summer Olympics
Olympic silver medalists for South Korea
Olympic medalists in fencing
Medalists at the 2012 Summer Olympics
Asian Games medalists in fencing
Fencers at the 2006 Asian Games
Fencers at the 2014 Asian Games
Asian Games silver medalists for South Korea
Medalists at the 2006 Asian Games
Medalists at the 2014 Asian Games
Universiade medalists in fencing
Universiade silver medalists for South Korea
Medalists at the 2013 Summer Universiade
Sportspeople from Gwangju
21st-century South Korean women